Thayumanavan is a 2003 Indian Tamil-language drama film written, produced and directed by Saravanan, who also stars in the lead role alongside actresses Prema  and Srichandana. Babloo Prithviraj, Sriman and Yugendran appear in supporting roles.

Cast

Saravanan as Dual role Senbagapandian and Duraipandian
Prema as Janaki
Srichandana as Anandavalli
Babloo Prithviraj as Kanna
Sriman as Chellamuthu
Yugendran as Veeramuthu
Lavanya as Thenmozhi
Bhuvaneswari
Alex
Ponnambalam

Production
Thayumanavan marked the directorial debut of actor Saravanan who also portrayed lead role in the film.

Soundtrack
The soundtrack was composed by debutant Vaigundavasaan.
"Puyal Adikkakandomey" - Roshini, Tippu
"Ezhumalaiyane" - Manikka Vinayagam
"Poonguyile" - Mano, Harini
"Aariraro" - Swarnalatha
"Anbe Manithan" - S. P. B.
"Oh Aasai" - S. P. B.

Reception
Chennai Online gave a negative review citing "The scripting is poor and the narration confused. The film is a lesson on how not to make a film".

References

2003 films
Indian action drama films
2000s Tamil-language films
2003 directorial debut films
2003 action drama films